Allanaquoich is a locality on Mar Lodge Estate, Aberdeenshire, Scotland.

Allanaquoich is little more than a farm house now although it once could have been described as a hamlet. It is located (streetmap) on a slight rise to the East of the Quoich Water.

A table in Dixon & Green (1995) shows the number of tenants at Allanaquoich being reduced as part of the Highland Clearances from 18 tenants in 1739 to just 1 by 1810 as a result.

See also
 Places, place names, and structures on Mar Lodge Estate

Sources
 

Buildings and structures on Mar Lodge Estate
Places and place names on Mar Lodge Estate